Eua zebrina is a species of tropical air-breathing land snail, terrestrial pulmonate gastropod mollusks in the family Partulidae. This species is endemic to American Samoa.

A cladogram showing phylogenic relations of Eua zebrina:

References

Partulidae
Gastropods described in 1847
Taxa named by Augustus Addison Gould
Taxonomy articles created by Polbot